Child Health International (CHI) is a Winchester (UK)-based charity, involved in improving the healthcare of children in Russia, Eastern Europe and a new project to help children with cystic fibrosis in India. It was founded as the International Integrated Health Association in 1992 by Roy and Dorothea Ridgway, the parents of a child with cystic fibrosis.

The charity's senior medical advisor is Dr Julian Legg, a paediatric consultant who is also head of the paediatric respiratory department at Southampton Children's Hospital. Mr Jim Hopwood is the current chairman.

Odessa University awarded Roy Ridgway a posthumous honorary doctorate for the charity's work helping Ukrainian children with cystic fibrosis and heart problems.

External links
Child Health International Official web site

References

Organizations established in 1992
Health charities in the United Kingdom
Charities based in Hampshire
Cystic fibrosis organizations
Organizations for children with health issues